The Great Eastern Handicap was an American Thoroughbred horse race first run in 1883 at Sheepshead Bay Race Track in Sheepshead Bay, Brooklyn, New York. A race for two-year-old horses of either sex, it was run on dirt over a distance of 6 furlongs.

The end of a race and of a racetrack
The Great Eastern Handicap was last run in September 1909 after the Republican controlled New York Legislature under Governor Charles Evans Hughes passed the Hart–Agnew anti-betting legislation on June 11, 1908. The owners of Sheepshead Bay Race Track, and other racing facilities in New York State, struggled to stay in business without betting. Racetrack operators had no choice but to drastically reduce the purse money being paid out which resulted in the Great Eastern Handicap offering a purse in 1909 that was one-quarter of what it had been in earlier years. These small purses made horse racing unprofitable and impossible for even the most successful horse owners to continue in business. As such, for the 1910 racing season management of the Sheepshead Bay facility dropped some of its minor stakes races and used the purse money to bolster its most important events. Further restrictive legislation was passed by the New York Legislature in 1910 which resulted in the deepening of the financial crisis for track operators and led to a complete shut down of racing across the state during 1911 and 1912. When a Court ruling saw racing return in 1913 it was too late for the Sheepshead Bay facility and it never reopened.

Historical notes
Jockey LaVerne Sewell, who won the 1906 edition, was killed in a racing accident later that year at Aqueduct Racetrack on November 9. In its story on the accident, the Pittsburgh Press called Sewell one of the most promising riders in the East. Sewell's death had been the fourth on the Eastern racetracks so far that year.

Race distances:
 6 furlongs: 1883–1889, 1901–1909 
 5.75 furlongs: 1890–1900 (Futurity course 1263 yards, 1 foot)

Records
Speed record:
 5.75 furlongs: 1:09.20 – Black Venus (1898)
 6 furlongs: 1:10.60 – Sewell (1906)

Most wins by a jockey:
 2 – Edward Garrison (1883, 1892)
 2 – Anthony Hamilton (1887, 1893)
 2 – Fred Taral (1896, 1897)

Most wins by a trainer: Ŧ
 3 – A. Jack Joyner (1892, 1903, 1904)

Most wins by an owner:
 2 – Blemton Stable (August Belmont Jr.) (1892, 1893)
 2 – John E. Madden (1897, 1907)

Ŧ based on 23 of the 27 years the race was run.

Winners

References

Flat horse races for two-year-olds
Open sprint category horse races
Discontinued horse races in New York City
Sheepshead Bay Race Track
Recurring sporting events established in 1883
Recurring sporting events disestablished in 1909
1883 establishments in New York (state)
1909 disestablishments in New York (state)